WISE J2209+2711 is a brown dwarf of spectral type Y0:, located in constellation Pegasus at 22 light-years from Earth. Its discovery was published in 2014 by Cushing et al.

See also
List of star systems within 20–25 light years

References

Pegasus (constellation)
Y-type stars
WISE objects